Marek Račuk (born 2 June 1992) is a Czech professional ice hockey player. He currently plays with Piráti Chomutov in the Czech Extraliga.

Račuk made his Czech Extraliga debut playing with Piráti Chomutov during the 2012–13 Czech Extraliga season.

References

External links

1992 births
Living people
Czech ice hockey centres
Piráti Chomutov players
People from Teplice
Sportspeople from the Ústí nad Labem Region
Sportovní Klub Kadaň players
Orli Znojmo players
LHK Jestřábi Prostějov players
HC Slavia Praha players
Rytíři Kladno players
MKS Cracovia (ice hockey) players
Czech expatriate ice hockey people
Expatriate ice hockey players in Poland
Czech expatriate sportspeople in Poland